Robert Hugh Carvel (born 6 September 1977) is a British actor. He has twice won a Laurence Olivier Award: for Best Actor in a Leading Role in a Musical for his role as Miss Trunchbull in Matilda the Musical, and for Best Actor in a Supporting Role for his performance as Rupert Murdoch in Ink. For the latter role, he won the Tony Award for Best Actor in a Featured Role in a Play.

On television, Carvel is known for playing Jonathan Strange in Jonathan Strange & Mr Norrell, Simon Foster in Doctor Foster, and Adam Dalgliesh in Dalgliesh.
Bertie also starred in itv drama The Sister in 2020.

Early life and education
Carvel was born in Marylebone, London, the son of a psychologist mother and John Carvel, a journalist. Carvel was educated at University College School, Hampstead. He gained a first class honours degree in English at the University of Sussex, going on to win a place at the Royal Academy of Dramatic Art (his acting training was paid for via scholarships from The Wall Trust and the Sir John Cass Foundation), graduating in 2003 after a three-year course.

Acting career

Theatre
Carvel has appeared in Revelations at the Hampstead Theatre, in Rose Bernd at the Arcola Theatre, as Alexander Ashbrook in the 2005–2006 and 2006–2007 National Theatre production of Helen Edmundson's Coram Boy and in their productions of The Life of Galileo and The Man of Mode, in Parade at the Donmar Warehouse, and in Matilda the Musical at the Cambridge Theatre, produced by the Royal Shakespeare Company.

Carvel was nominated for the Laurence Olivier Award for Best Actor in a Leading Role in a Musical for his performance in Parade in 2008. He won the award in the same category in 2012 for his performance as Miss Trunchbull in Matilda the Musical, a production that won six other Oliviers. Carvel also won the UK's TMA Award for Best Performance in a Musical and was similarly nominated for the London's Evening Standard Award. He played Enrico in Damned By Despair at the National Theatre.

In March 2013, he reprised his role as Miss Trunchbull in Matilda on Broadway at the Shubert Theatre. This won him a Drama Desk Award for Outstanding Actor in a Featured Role in a Musical and a nomination for Tony Award for Best Actor in a Leading Role in a Musical, one of only a handful of nominations for an actor portraying a character of the opposite sex.

From August to October 2015, Carvel played both Pentheus and Agave in Bakkhai at the Almeida Theatre. Carvel also performed as Yank in the play The Hairy Ape at the Old Vic in November of the same year.

In February 2016, Carvel announced his directorial debut. He directed the play Strife at the Minerva Theatre, Chichester, which opened in August 2016.

In September 2017, Carvel played the role of Rupert Murdoch in the play Ink by James Graham, which debuted at the Almeida Theatre before transferring to the West End. In April 2019 Ink transferred to Broadway, with Carvel reprising his role. This performance won him a Tony Award for Best Featured Actor in a Play.

In 2022 he returned to the Old Vic to play US President Donald Trump in The 47th, a new play by Mike Bartlett.

Roles in other media
Carvel has appeared in several other film, TV and theatre roles, including The Wrong Mans, Babylon, Doctor Who (episode "The Lazarus Experiment"), Sherlock (episode "The Blind Banker"), Bombshell, Hawking, The Crimson Petal and the White, Money and Midsomer Murders (episode "The Great and the Good"). He played Lord Carmarthen in John Adams. In the television film Agatha Christie: A Life in Pictures, he played Christie's second husband Max Mallowan. Carvel appeared as Bamatabois in the film Les Misérables, based on the musical of the same name. Carvel is also the voice of the male Imperial Agent in the MMORPG Star Wars: The Old Republic. In 2009, Carvel played Wormwood in Focus on the Family's audio adaptation of The Screwtape Letters, alongside Andy Serkis as Screwtape. This production was a 2010 Audie Award finalist.

In 2015, Carvel starred as Jonathan Strange in the BBC One adaptation of Susanna Clarke's novel Jonathan Strange & Mr Norrell, opposite Eddie Marsan as Gilbert Norrell. He played Nick Clegg in the Channel 4 drama Coalition and in September appeared as the unfaithful husband of Suranne Jones's title character in the BBC One thriller series Doctor Foster. The second series of Doctor Foster started filming in September 2016 and started broadcast in September 2017.

Since 2021, Carvel has starred as Adam Dalgliesh in Helen Edmundson's Dalgliesh. He plays former Prime Minister Tony Blair in the fifth and sixth series of The Crown.

Personal life
Carvel is a Patron of the Globe Theatre's education department's 'Playing Shakespeare' programme, which provides free educational resources and free theatre tickets to secondary school students. In 2013 he ran for and was elected to Equity's 11-person Stage Committee. He was re-elected for a further two-year term in 2015.

Carvel is married to actress Sally Scott, whom he wed on 5 January 2019 after dating for ten years. Their first child was born in May 2020.

Acting credits

Film

Television

Theatre

Video games

Audio

Accolades

Theatre

See also
List of British actors

References

External links

Bertie Carvel | Stage | The Guardian

1977 births
Living people
20th-century English male actors
21st-century English male actors
English male film actors
English male musical theatre actors
English male television actors
English male video game actors
English male voice actors
English male singers
Male actors from London
Alumni of RADA
Alumni of the University of Sussex
People from Marylebone
Drama Desk Award winners
Laurence Olivier Award winners
Tony Award winners
Theatre World Award winners